Hodak is a Croatian surname. Notable people with the surname include:

Bojan Hodak (born 1971), Croatian footballer and manager
Domenica Hodak (born 1991), American soccer player
Jerry Hodak (born 1942), American television meteorologist

Croatian surnames